This is a list of films which have placed number one at the weekend box office in the United Kingdom during 2016.

Films

Notes

References

2016
United Kingdom
2016 in British cinema